Chandigarh Capital Region (CCR) or Chandigarh Metropolitan Region (CMR)  is an area, which includes the union territory city of Chandigarh, and its neighboring cities of Mohali, Kharar, Zirakpur, New Chandigarh (in Punjab) and Panchkula (in Haryana). Chandigarh Administration, Greater Mohali Area Development Authority (GMADA) and Haryana Urban Development Authority (HUDA) are different authorities responsible for development of this region.

The economy of the region is interdependent as the area is continuously inhabited, though falling under different states. There is a lot of movement of people and goods daily to and from suburbs, like most of the people working in Chandigarh live in a suburb like Zirakpur. The local industry is on the outskirts like Derabassi, Lalru and Baddi. The vast majority of skilled workers in the private sector come from neighboring states like Himachal Pradesh, Punjab, and Haryana.

History
The Indian Ministry of Home Affairs asked the Chandigarh Administration in October 2011 to "coordinate with the Punjab and Haryana governments for working out the modalities" of a Regional Planning Board (RPB) for the Chandigarh Capital Region (CCR). The intention was to harmonize and improve facilities across the region and coordinate local administrations. Responsibilities of the RPB would include disaster management, health planning, biomedical waste and traffic management.

The 'Master Plan 2031' submitted to the UT administrator in January 2013 included a proposal for a "inter-state regional plan for the Chandigarh Capital Region". However the final plan confined itself to the UT boundary, and did not mention the proposed "Chandigarh Capital Region". Instead, the plan expected responsibilities for the region to be coordinated between Punjab, Haryana and Chandigarh UT, and that the Chandigarh plan "with the GMADA Plan 2056 and the Haryana Development Plan should together arrive at a metropolitan plan".

 the Chandigarh capital region along the lines of the National Capital Region remains an un-implemented concept.

Definition
The cities, towns and areas that would be part of the Chandigarh Capital region have a total population of  1,758,653 and their city-wise populations are:

Overall Chandigarh ( UT ), Mohali District (Punjab) and Panchkula District ( Haryana ) are part of the CCR

Derabassi, Lalru, Banur and Kurali in Mohali district. Kalka, Pinjore, Barwala and Raipur Rani in the Panchkula district can be considered another town in Chandigarh Capital Region

In future, it can be expanded up to BBN ( Baddi-Brotiwala-Nalagarh) Area in Himachal Pradesh and Roopnagar City in Punjab.

Industry 

Chandigarh IT Park is a technology park located within Chandigarh, with presence of companies like IDS Infotech, Airtel, Tech Mahindra and Infosys.

Mohali IT City is the infrastructure to facilitate information technology in the city. It spreads over 1700 acres developed by GMADA situated near Chandigarh International Airport. Infosys is given 50 Acres of land to develop state of art campus.

Quark has 40 Acres campus in Mohali for Quark software Inc. and other IT Companies like Emerson and Infosys.

Mahindra-Swaraj Tractors, Mohali

Godrej - Godrej & Boyce Mfg Co Ltd, Mohali

Semi-Conductor Laboratory ( SCL), Mohali

Punwire,Puncom, Verka and Sun Pharma also have Plants in Mohali

Dera Bassi - Lalru is another belt with mostly medium industry, this place has many spinning mills including the Nahar group. Bhushan Steel also has a presence here.

Panchkula IT Park is the state of art infrastructure to facilitate information technology in the city. It spreads over 74 acres developed by HSIIDC situated in sector 22. 
Bharat Electronics Limited or B.E.L has a factory in Panchkula.

Hindustan Machine Tools has a tractor factory in Pinjore, while Associated Cement Companies has a cement factory in Pinjore.

SML-ISUZU has Bus & Truck Plant near Ropar City.

The metropolitan areas of Chandigarh, Mohali, and Panchkula collectively form a tri-city. Chandigarh and Tri-City play a role in this surging demand for digital marketing experts.

This region is the zonal headquarters for a large number of banks, their offices are mainly in the "Bank Square" in sector 17 Chandigarh. This area also houses the regional office (usually covering Punjab, Northern Haryana, Himachal Pradesh and Jammu and Kashmir) for a lot of FMCG companies.

Healthcare Infrastructure

The prominent hospitals in the region are

 Post Graduate Institute of Medical Education and Research PGIMER, Sector 12, Chandigarh
 Govt Medical Superspeciality Hospital (GMSH), Sector 16, Chandigarh
 Govt Medical College and Hospital (GMCH), Sector 32, Chandigarh
 Dr. B.R. Ambedkar State Institute of Medical Sciences, Sector 56, Mohali
 Max Hospital, Sector 56, Mohali
 Fortis Hospital, Sector 62, Mohali
 General Hospital, Sector 6, Panchkula
 Command Hospital, Chandimandir Cantonment
 Alchemist Hospital, Sector 21, Panchkula
 Ojas Hospital, Sector 26, Panchkula
 Paras Hospital, HSIIDC Park, Sector 22, Panchkula

Educational Institutes

Schools 
Yadavindra Public School, Mohali
St. John's High School, Chandigarh
Government Model Senior Secondary School, Sector 16, Chandigarh 
Shivalik Public School, Chandigarh
VHS
Bhavan Vidyalaya, Chandigarh
Strawberry Fields School, Chandigarh
Carmel Convent School, Chandigarh
St Soldier’s School, Panchkula

Colleges and Universities 
IIT Ropar
IISER Mohali
NIPER Mohali
ISB Mohali
INST Mohali
National Agro Biotechnology Institute Mohali
C-DAC Mohali
National Institute of Electronics & Information Technology, Ropar
National Institute of Electronics & Information Technology, Chandigarh
P.U. Chandigarh
Punjab Engineering College, Chandigarh
Chandigarh College of Engineering & Technology
PGI Chandigarh
IMTECH Chandigarh
CSIO Chandigarh
TBRL-DRDO Chandigarh
GMCH, Chandigarh
NIFT Panchkula
Chandigarh University
Plaksha University
Amity University, Mohali
Army Institute of Law
NIIFT Mohali

Sports 

Punjab Cricket Association IS Bindra Stadium, Mohali

Maharaja Yadavindra Singh International Cricket Stadium, New Chandigarh

International Hockey Stadium, Mohali

GMADA Sports Complex, Sec-78, Mohali

Sports Complex, Sector 7, Chandigarh

Chandigarh Lawn tennis Association, CLTA Stadium, Sector 10, Chandigarh

Cricket Stadium Sector 16, Chandigarh

Hockey Stadium and Sports Complex, Sector-42, Chandigarh

Golf Course, Sector 6, Chandigarh

Tau Devi Lal Cricket Stadium, Sector 3 Panchkula

Golf Course, Sector 3 Panchkula

Sports Authority of India stadium, Dayalpura, Zirakpur

Transport

Road transport

ISBT, SEC-17, Chandigarh

ISBT, SEC-43, Chandigarh

ISBT, SEC-57, Mohali

ISBT, SEC-5, Panchkula

Rail transport

Chandigarh Railway Station

Mohali Railway Station

Air transport

Shaheed Bhagat Singh International Airport is located near Aerocity in Mohali. It has both domestic and international flights.

External links 
 Chandigarh Master Plan 2031

References 

Chandigarh